Eaton is a town in Union Township, Delaware County, Indiana, along the Mississinewa River. The population was 1,595 at the 2020 census. It is part of the Muncie, IN Metropolitan Statistical Area.

History
Eaton was laid out and platted in 1854. The town incorporated as a village in 1873, soon after the railroad had been built through the neighborhood.

The first discovery of natural gas in Indiana occurred in the town of Eaton in 1876. The discovery set off the Indiana Gas Boom, leading to two decades of rapid regional growth.

Geography
Eaton is located at  (40.339675, -85.353746).

Demographics

2020 census
As of the census of 2020,  there were 1,595 people, 661 households, and 379 families living in the town. The racial makeup of the town was 96.2% White, 0.3% African American, 0.3% Native American or Alaskan Native, 0.1% Asian, 0.4% from other races, and 0.3% from two or more races. Hispanic or Latino of any race were 1.1% of the population.

There were 661 households, of which 22.7% had children under the age of 18 living with them, 41.7% were married couples living together, 23.4% had a female householder with no husband present,  28.0% had a male householder with no wife present, and 6.9% were non-families. 51.4% of all households were made up of individuals. The average household size was 2.41 and the average family size was 3.01.

27.5% of the population had never been married. 41.7% of residents were married and not separated, 8.1% were widowed, 18.9% were divorced, and 3.6% were separated.

The median age in the town was 34.6. 6.8% of residents were under the age of 5; 22.7% of residents were under the age of 18; 77.3% were age 18 or older; and 17.6% were age 65 or older. 9.4% of the population were veterans.

The only language spoken at home was English at 100%. None of the population were foreign born.

The median household income in Gaston was $45,385, 19.2% less than the median average for the state of Indiana. 10.4% of the population were in poverty, including 13.9% of residents under the age of 18. The poverty rate for the town was 2.5% lower than that of the state. 17.0% of the population was disabled and 6.1% had no healthcare coverage. 40.8% of the population had attained a high school or equivalent degree, 25.7% had attended college but received no degree, 13.6% had attained an Associate's degree or higher, 6.4% had attained a Bachelor's degree or higher, and 3.7% had a graduate or professional degree. 9.8% had no degree. 56.0% of Eaton residents were employed, working a mean of 39.7 hours per week.

2010 census
As of the census of 2010, there were 1,805 people, 696 households, and 508 families living in the town. The racial makeup of the town was 97.8% White, 0.1% African American, 0.3% Native American, 0.1% Asian, 0.4% from other races, and 1.3% from two or more races. Hispanic or Latino of any race were 1.8% of the population.

There were 696 households, of which 37.8% had children under the age of 18 living with them, 52.6% were married couples living together, 14.1% had a female householder with no husband present, 6.3% had a male householder with no wife present, and 27.0% were non-families. 23.3% of all households were made up of individuals, and 10.5% had someone living alone who was 65 years of age or older. The average household size was 2.59 and the average family size was 3.03.

The median age in the town was 36.3 years. 27.4% of residents were under the age of 18; 8.8% were between the ages of 18 and 24; 25.7% were from 25 to 44; 23.9% were from 45 to 64; and 14.2% were 65 years of age or older. The gender makeup of the town was 51.1% male and 48.9% female.

2000 census
As of the census of 2000, there were 1,603 people, 619 households, and 459 families living in the town. The racial makeup of the town was 98.75% White, 0.25% Native American, 0.06% Asian, 0.12% from other races, and 0.81% from two or more races. Hispanic or Latino of any race were 0.81% of the population.

There were 619 households, out of which 40.2% had children under the age of 18 living with them, 57.2% were married couples living together, 11.0% had a female householder with no husband present, and 25.7% were non-families. 23.6% of all households were made up of individuals, and 9.2% had someone living alone who was 65 years of age or older. The average household size was 2.59 and the average family size was 3.00.

In the town, the population was spread out, with 30.6% under the age of 18, 7.7% from 18 to 24, 29.8% from 25 to 44, 19.8% from 45 to 64, and 12.0% who were 65 years of age or older. The median age was 33 years. For every 100 females, there were 96.7 males. For every 100 females age 18 and over, there were 91.4 males.

The median income for a household in the town was $31,563, and the median income for a family was $35,625. Males had a median income of $31,573 versus $20,645 for females. The per capita income for the town was $13,833. About 9.5% of families and 11.1% of the population were below the poverty line, including 13.9% of those under age 18 and 3.5% of those age 65 or over.

Education

Eaton Elementary School 
Eaton Elementary School is a public elementary school located here in Eaton, Indiana. The school is a part of the Delaware Community School Corporation that serves around 275 students in grades kindergarten to 5th grade. Their mascot is the Eaton Norsemen, formerly the Roadrunner. During the school year, the Latchkey program is offered before and after school to provide a safe and fun environment for students. During the summer months, Summer Blast, is offered for the same purposes.

Eaton Public Library 
Eaton Public Library is a non-profit library funded wholly by memberships and donations. Through the support of volunteer staff, the library is open 7 days a week. The library offers family and individual memberships for the year, 3 months, or even just the day for an individual. Memberships are open to all residents of East-Central Indiana. The library currently does not have a website, though they can be found on Facebook and even through their online catalog.

References

Towns in Delaware County, Indiana
Towns in Indiana
1873 establishments in Indiana
Populated places established in 1873